R&F Properties is a Chinese property developer based in Zhujiang New Town, Guangzhou, Guangdong. Established in 1994, it is one of the largest-scale real estate companies in Guangzhou. It is engaged in integrating real estate design, development, engineering supervision, sales, property management and real estate intermediary.

Its H shares were listed at the Hong Kong Stock Exchange on 14 July 2005. It is also the first mainland real estate enterprise joining into Hang Seng China Enterprises Index.

Developments
 Tianjin R&F Guangdong Tower
 Tianjin R&F Center
R&F Princess Cove
 Vauxhall Square, London (UK)

Subsidiaries
 Guangzhou City F.C.
 R&F (Hong Kong)

References

External links
 

Companies formerly in the Hang Seng China Enterprises Index
Companies listed on the Hong Kong Stock Exchange
Real estate companies of China
Civilian-run enterprises of China
Companies based in Guangzhou
Real estate companies established in 1994